Solidago hispida, the hairy goldenrod, is North American species of flowering plants in the family Asteraceae. Its native range extends from Newfoundland west to Saskatchewan, and south as far as Oklahoma, Louisiana, and Georgia.

One plant can produce more than 250 small yellow flower heads in branching arrays at the tops of the stems.

References

hispida
Flora of North America
Plants described in 1803
Taxa named by Gotthilf Heinrich Ernst Muhlenberg